Barbara Ann Rausch (1941–2001) was a Los Angeles-based comics artist and writer.

Biography
Barb Rausch was born on 7 June 1941, and worked on a number of comic books, cartoons and newspaper comic strips. She worked on comic books including Barbie comics (Marvel Comics), The Desert Peach, and Omaha the Cat Dancer (Kitchen Sink Press), created work for Disney Studios, and was a continuing collaborator on Arn Saba's Neil the Horse. Rausch worked as an art teacher in Flint, Michigan during the early 1970s.

References

External links
Barb Rausch at INDUCKS Disney database

1941 births
2001 deaths
American female comics artists